Gazette is a British television series which first aired on ITV in 1968. It starred Gerald Harper as James Hadleigh, a millionaire who relocates from London to Yorkshire and buys a local newspaper founded by his father many years before. The cast also included Jon Laurimore, Ralph Michael and Gillian Wray. Harper had just come off his starring role in the BBC series Adam Adamant Lives.

The show was made by Yorkshire Television and was popular with audiences. Although a second series of Gazette was initially planned, it was instead decided to launch a follow-up called Hadleigh which focused on the title character in his role as a local landowner. This ran for four series between 1969 and 1976.

References

Bibliography
 Tise Vahimagi. British Television: An Illustrated Guide. Oxford University Press, 1996.

External links
 

ITV television dramas
Television shows set in Yorkshire
1968 British television series debuts
1960s British drama television series
English-language television shows
Television series by Yorkshire Television